Lipno may refer to places:

Bosnia and Herzegovina 
Lipno (Ljubuški), a village in the municipality of Ljubuški

Czech Republic 
Lipno (Louny District), a municipality and village in the Ústí nad Labem Region
Lipno, a village and part of Líšťany (Plzeň-North District) in the Plzeň Region
Lipno nad Vltavou, a municipality and village in the South Bohemian Region
Lipno Reservoir, a reservoir on the Vltava River in the South Bohemian Region

Poland 
Lipno, Lipno County, a town in the Kuyavian-Pomeranian Voivodeship, seat of Lipno County, north-central Poland
Lipno County
Lipno, Gmina Lipno, a village in the Kuyavian-Pomeranian Voivodeship, north-central Poland
Lipno, Świecie County, a village in the Kuyavian-Pomeranian Voivodeship, north-central Poland
Lipno, Lublin Voivodeship, a village in the Lublin Voivodeship, east Poland
Lipno, Łódź Voivodeship, a village in the Łódź Voivodeship, central Poland
Lipno, Świętokrzyskie Voivodeship, a village in the Świętokrzyskie Voivodeship, south-central Poland
Lipno, Łosice County, a village in the Łosice County, east-central Poland
Lipno, Przysucha County, a village in the Masovian Voivodeship, east-central Poland
Lipno, Greater Poland Voivodeship, a village in the Greater Poland Voivodeship, west-central Poland
Lipno, Strzelce-Drezdenko County, a village in the Lubusz Voivodeship, west Poland
Lipno, Zielona Góra County, a village in the Lubusz Voivodeship, west Poland
Lipno, Opole Voivodeship, a village in the Opole Voivodeship, south-west Poland
Lipno, Pomeranian Voivodeship, a village in the Pomeranian Voivodeship, north Poland
Lipno, West Pomeranian Voivodeship, a village in the West Pomeranian Voivodeship, north-west Poland
Lipno (lake), a lake in the Tuchola Forest, Pomeranian Voivodeship, north Poland